François A. Pouliot (June 6, 1896 – March 11, 1990) was a Canadian politician and a two-term Member of the Legislative Assembly of Quebec.

Background

He was born in Holyoke, Massachusetts on June 6, 1896.

Political career

Pouliot ran as a Conservative candidate in the provincial district of Missisquoi in the 1931 and 1935 elections. He succeeded on his second attempt.

He joined Maurice Duplessis's Union Nationale and was re-elected in the 1936 election. He served as his party's House Whip until his defeat in the 1939 election.

Death

He died on March 11, 1990.

References

1896 births
1990 deaths
American emigrants to Canada
Conservative Party of Quebec MNAs
People from Holyoke, Massachusetts
Union Nationale (Quebec) MNAs